John Herman Corns (March 21, 1936 – May 12, 2020) was a  lieutenant general in the United States Army who served as commander of United States Army Pacific from 1991 until 1993.

Corns was a 1954 graduate of South Charleston High School in West Virginia. He received a B.A. degree in civil government from Marshall University in 1958 and later earned an M.S. degree in public administration from Shippensburg State College. He also received military education at the Armed Forces Staff College and the US Army War College. He was commissioned as a second lieutenant from the ROTC in November 1958. He then went on to serve in the Infantry and Special Forces in Vietnam. His first major command was Brigade Commander for 2nd Brigade, 2nd Infantry Division, Korea from 1978 to 1979. Upon promotion to Major General, Corns commanded the 6th Infantry Division (Light) as well as Fort Richardson, Alaska from 1986 to 1988. From there he served as Commanding General, United States Army Japan and Commanding General, IX Corps, APO San Francisco until 1989.

Additional major duty assignments for Corns included serving as the Chief of the Plans and Operations Division for the Chief of Legislative Liaison, US Army, as well as Deputy Chief, Legislative Liaison, for the Secretary of the US Army. He served as Assistant Division Commander for the 7th Infantry Division, Fort Ord, California, and Deputy Chief of Staff for Training for the United States Army Training and Doctrine Command, Fort Monroe, Virginia. Gen. Corns was the Inspector General for the US Army in Washington, DC from 1989 to 1991. He retired on November 30, 1993.

His awards include the Distinguished Service Medal, the Legion of Merit, the Bronze Star Medal, the Meritorious Service Medal, and the Army Staff Identification Badge.

Corns died on May 12, 2020 at the age of 84. He was interred at Arlington National Cemetery on June 24, 2020.

References

1936 births
2020 deaths
People from Boone County, West Virginia
South Charleston High School alumni
Marshall University alumni
United States Army personnel of the Vietnam War
Recipients of the Air Medal
Shippensburg University of Pennsylvania alumni
Recipients of the Meritorious Service Medal (United States)
Recipients of the Legion of Merit
United States Army generals
Recipients of the Distinguished Service Medal (US Army)
Burials at Arlington National Cemetery
Military personnel from West Virginia